Diana Jennifer Arévalo (born October 27, 1981) is an American politician, who is a Democratic former member of the Texas House of Representatives, representing the 116th District. She ran unopposed in the November 2016 general election after defeating two opponents in the Democratic primary. Arévalo served on the Rules and Resolutions, Defense and Veteran's Affairs, and Public Health committees.

In 2018, Arévalo was defeated for re-nomination by her predecessor, Trey Martinez Fischer, in the March 6 primary. She polled 4,627 votes (49.4 percent) to Martinez Fischer's 4,742 votes (50.6 percent). Her term of office expired in January 2019.

References

External links
 State legislative page
 Profile at Texas Tribune

1981 births
Hispanic and Latino American state legislators in Texas
Hispanic and Latino American women in politics
Living people
Democratic Party members of the Texas House of Representatives
21st-century American politicians
Women state legislators in Texas
21st-century American women politicians